Yessir Whatever is a compilation album by American hip-hop duo Quasimoto, which is composed of Madlib and his animated alter ego Lord Quas. The album was released on June 18, 2013 by Stones Throw Records. The album features a compilation of songs released on rare & out-of-print vinyl and a few others that were previously unreleased.

Track listing
All tracks produced by Madlib

References

2013 compilation albums
Madlib albums
Stones Throw Records albums
Hip hop compilation albums